Kim Yoo-ran (born 23 April 1992) is a South Korean bobsledder. She competed in the two-woman event at the 2018 Winter Olympics.

She also competed in the monobob event at the IBSF World Championships 2021 held in Altenberg, Germany.

References

External links
 

1992 births
Living people
South Korean female bobsledders
Olympic bobsledders of South Korea
Bobsledders at the 2018 Winter Olympics
Bobsledders at the 2022 Winter Olympics
Place of birth missing (living people)